Democratic Labour Party may refer to:

 Democratic Labour Party (Australia) – spelt Labor until 2013
 Democratic Labour Party (Barbados)
 Democratic Labour Party (Brazil)
 Democratic Labour Party (Czech Republic), a defunct Czech political party. 
 Democratic Labour Party of Lithuania
 Democratic Labour Party (New Zealand)
 Democratic Labor Party (South Korea)
 Democratic Labour Party (Spain), or PTD
 Democratic Labour Party (Trinidad and Tobago), a Trinidadian political party that existed from 1957 to 1971.
 Democratic Labour Party (UK, 1972), a  UK political party that existed from 1972 to 1980. 
 Democratic Labour Party (UK, 1998), a  UK political party that existed from 1998 to 2016
 West Indies Democratic Labour Party a West Indian political party group that existed from 1958 to 1962.
 Minnesota Democratic–Farmer–Labor Party in the United States

See also
List of political parties by name
Democratic Party (disambiguation)
Labour Party (disambiguation)
National Labour Party (disambiguation)